Vasco Rafael Rodrigues de Campos (born 25 April 1988 in Barreiro) is a Portuguese footballer who played as a right defender. He played on the Portuguese second tier for Freamunde.

References

1988 births
Sportspeople from Barreiro, Portugal
Living people
Portuguese footballers
Association football defenders
GD Beira-Mar players
C.D. Cova da Piedade players
Eléctrico F.C. players
S.C. Freamunde players
Associação Naval 1º de Maio players
Portugal youth international footballers